Louise Schack Elholm (born 26 October 1977 in Slagelse) is a Danish politician, who is a member of the Folketing for the Venstre political party. She was elected into parliament at the 2007 Danish general election. She is currently serving as minister of ecclesiastical affairs since 2022.

Political career
Elholm was first elected into the Folketing in the 2007 general election. She was reelected in 2011 with 5,379	votes cast for her. In the 2015 election she was elected with 3,185 votes and in 2019 with 4,229 votes.

On 15 December 2022, she was appointed minister of ecclesiastical affairs in Mette Frederiksen's second cabinet.

External links 
 Biography on the website of the Danish Parliament (Folketinget)

References 

Living people
1977 births
People from Slagelse
21st-century Danish women politicians
Women members of the Folketing
Venstre (Denmark) politicians
Members of the Folketing 2007–2011
Members of the Folketing 2011–2015
Members of the Folketing 2015–2019
Members of the Folketing 2019–2022
Members of the Folketing 2022–2026